Ricardo Pérez de Zabalza Goytre (born 14 April 1977), commonly known as Richi, is a Spanish retired footballer who played mainly as an attacking midfielder.

A late bloomer, he only began playing football well into his 20s, making his La Liga debut at 26. He spent most of his ten-year professional career with Real Murcia (two spells), playing 250 league matches and scoring 29 goals both major levels of Spanish football combined.

Club career
After beginning his career at already 23 with amateurs CF Rayo Majadahonda in his hometown of Madrid, Richi spent two further seasons with Atlético Madrid's reserves, having begun his career as a striker. In the 2002–03 campaign he joined Real Murcia, achieving promotion and making his La Liga debut in his second year, his first appearance in the competition being in a 1–1 away draw against RC Celta de Vigo on 31 August 2003; an instrumental attacking element from the beginning, he scored twice in 35 games as the club returned to the top flight again in 2007.

Richi signed with second division's CD Tenerife in August 2008. He netted six goals in 36 matches, as the Canary Islands side returned to the top level after seven years.

Richi was not as important in the following season, playing nearly 1,600 less minutes and only scoring once, when he opened a 4–1 home win over RCD Espanyol on 14 March 2010. In the summer, with Tenerife ultimately relegated, the 33-year-old returned to Murcia, also relegated but in division two.

References

External links

1977 births
Living people
Footballers from Madrid
Spanish footballers
Association football midfielders
La Liga players
Segunda División players
Segunda División B players
Tercera División players
CF Rayo Majadahonda players
Atlético Madrid B players
Real Murcia players
CD Tenerife players